Tekkno is the sixth studio album by German metalcore band Electric Callboy. The album was released on 16 September 2022 through Century Media Records. It is the band's first album to feature Nico Sallach as the band's clean vocalist and their first since they changed their name from Eskimo Callboy to Electric Callboy.

Background
On 22 December 2021, the band announced that they were removing old songs from all platforms due to offensive lyrics and that they would be changing their band name. On March 9, 2022, the band announced their new name, Electric Callboy from now on. The band changed the word 'Eskimo' to 'Electric' because it can be seen as a derogatory name for the Inuit and Yupik people in Alaska. They subsequently re-released the artwork from their previous albums with their new name.

Release and promotion
On 3 September 2021, the band released the lead single, "We Got the Moves". On 3 December 2021, the band released the second single, "Pump It". On 6 December 2021, the band submitted "Pump It" into the German national selection for the Eurovision Song Contest 2022, but ultimately were not included in the final list of participants. In December 2021, the band announced that they would be going on a United States tour with Attack Attack! from October to November 2022.

On 8 April 2022, the band released their first song under their new name, "Spaceman", featuring rapper Finch. On 15 April 2022, Electric Callboy announced Tekkno, which was released on 9 September 2022.

On 8 July 2022, the band released the fourth single, "Fckboi", with the American metalcore band Conquer Divide. On 19 August 2022, the band released the fifth single, "Hurrikan". The release date for the album was changed to 16 September 2022. In the following week, they had to postpone their UK/France Tour as well as cancelling their participation on the US Level-Up tour with Attack Attack! due to their singer Nico Sallach having a jaw and middle ear infection. On 21 November 2022, the band released a music video for "Mindreader".

Composition
Tekkno has been described as metalcore, pop, electro, alternative rock, electronica, synth-pop, and pop metal. Tuonela Magazine described the album as a "mash-up between Eurodance-inspired tunes and brutal djent-sprinkled riffs. According to Hysteria Mag, "Fckboi" leans into a pop punk sound, while utilizing alternative rock and trap elements. Nicholas Senior writing for New Noise Magazine, noted "house styles" on "Neon". "Mindreader" and "Parasite" mix the band's metalcore and rave sound. "Mindreader" opens with an "atmospheric trance/synth intro". The song "Hurrikan" starts off with German schlager and switches to deathcore.

Reception

Tekkno received generally positive reviews from critics. Nicholas Senior of New Noise Magazine stated, "Tekkno appropriately feels like a rebirth for the famed ravecore pioneers. A new name, a renewed sense of style, and clearly they were having as much fun as possible when making this." Writing for Sputnikmusic, Trey noted improvements this album made in comparison to the band's previous work stating, "Each album since Crystals had been increasingly bland and uninspired, while at the same time neutering the heavier elements of their past; Tekkno fixes all of that...huge breakdowns, brilliant pop choruses, modern and old-school electro, metalcore riffs, and a large dose of escapist fun." Paul Brown was positive towards the album's mix of EDM and metal and called the album "wacky, unpredictable and...one of the funniest releases in recent years." Nick Ruskell of Kerrang! was less positive towards the different elements the band uses stating, "the disparate elements of the music are all so brightly coloured that often they refuse to mix...the novelty is stretched so far that it's hard to see past it."

Commercial performance
Tekkno entered the German albums chart at No. 1 in the week after release, the highest ranking any record of Electric Callboy achieved.

Track listing

Personnel
Electric Callboy
 Kevin Ratajczak – unclean vocals, keyboards, programming, production
 Daniel "Danskimo" Haniß – lead guitar, production, mixing 
 Pascal Schillo – rhythm guitar, backing vocals, production 
 Daniel Klossek – bass guitar, backing vocals 
 David-Karl Friedrich – drums 
 Nico Sallach – clean vocals

Guests
 Conquer Divide – "Fckboi"
 Finch – "Spaceman"

Additional personnel
 Conquer Divide – production ("Fckboi")
 Daniel Großmann – production ("Spaceman")
 Christoph Wieczorek – mastering

Charts

Weekly charts

Year-end charts

References

2022 albums
Century Media Records albums
Electric Callboy albums